Daniël Francois Retief  (28 June 1925 – 22 September 2010) was a South African rugby union player.

Playing career
Retief matriculated at Lichtenburg High School and took his BCom degree at the University of Pretoria.

Retief made his test match debut for  against Robin Thompson's British Lions side in 1955 at Ellis Park in front of over 90,000 fans. He toured with the Springboks to Australia and New Zealand in 1956 and was one of the few players who represented South Africa in all six Test matches on the tour. On the tour he scored 11 tries, 3 of which were in tests and during a difficult tour where the team was plagued by injuries, Retief played in 18 games.

Test history

See also
List of South Africa national rugby union players – Springbok no. 320

References

1925 births
2010 deaths
South African rugby union players
South Africa international rugby union players
Blue Bulls players
Rugby union players from North West (South African province)
Rugby union wings